Renato Bueno de Vecchi Marins (born 7 February 1989 in Brazil), sometimes known as Nirvana, is a Brazilian footballer.

Career

De Vecchi started his career with Brasilis Futebol Clube. In 2009, he signed for Associação Desportiva São Caetano. In 2012, he signed for Rio Claro Futebol Clube. In 2016, De Vecchi signed for Thisted FC. In 2017, De Vecchi signed for Glenavon F.C. In 2018, hesigned for South Hobart FC. In 2019, he signed for Lillehammer FK.

References

Brazilian footballers
1989 births
Living people
Association football wingers
Association football forwards
South Hobart FC players
Associação Desportiva São Caetano players
Esporte Clube São Bento players
Thisted FC players
Glenavon F.C. players
Grêmio Barueri Futebol players
Rio Claro Futebol Clube players